Wayne Wilson may refer to:

Wayne Wilson (American football) (born 1957), American football running back
Wayne Wilson (ice hockey) (born 1963), Canadian ice hockey coach
Wayne Wilson (weightlifter) (born 1949), Canadian Olympic weightlifter